Koya is both a Malabar Muslim surname and a masculine Japanese given name. Notable people with the name include:

Surname:
 Sidiq Koya (1924–1993), Fijian-Indian politician and opposition leader
 C. H. Mohammed Koya (1927–1983), Indian politician and Chief Minister of Kerala
 P. P. Ummer Koya (1922–2000), Indian politician
 P. Pookunhi Koya (born 1949), Indian politician
 Mammukoya (born 1946), Malayalam film actor

Given name:
 Koya Nishikawa (born 1942), Japanese politician
 Koya Shimizu (born 1982), Japanese footballer

Fictional characters:
 Koya, a Teenage Mutant Ninja Turtles character

Japanese masculine given names
Surnames of Indian origin